Serratorotula is a genus of air-breathing land snails, terrestrial pulmonate gastropod mollusks in the family Geomitridae, the hairy snails and their allies.

Species
Species within the genus Serratorotula include:
 † Serratorotula acarinata (Hemmen & Groh, 1985) 
 Serratorotula coronata (Deshayes, 1850)
 † Serratorotula gerberi (Groh & Hemmen, 1986) 
 Serratorotula juliformis (R. T. Lowe, 1852)

References

 Groh, K. & Hemmen, J. (1986). Geomitra (Serratorotula) gerberi n. subgen. n. sp. aus dem Quartär von Porto Santo (Pulmonata: Helicidae). Archiv für Molluskenkunde, 117 (1/3): 33-38. Frankfurt am Main.

External links
 Nomenclator Zoologicus info

Geomitridae